The 1993–94 season of the Slovak Second Football League (also known as 2. liga) was the first ever season of the league since its establishment. It began in late July 1993 and ended in June 1994.

League standing

See also
1993–94 Slovak Superliga

References
 Jindřich Horák, Lubomír Král: Encyklopedie našeho fotbalu, Libri 1997
 Igor Mráz: Päť rokov futbalu, SFZ 1998

2. Liga (Slovakia) seasons
2
Slovak